Nuestra Belleza Quintana Roo 2011, was held in the Hotel Gran Oasis in Cancún, Quintana Roo on July 1, 2011. At the conclusion of the final night of competition Valery Gantert of Cancún was crowned the winner. Gantert was crowned by Lupita Jones. Six contestants competed for the title.

Results

Placements

Contestants

References

External links
Official Website

Nuestra Belleza México